Black Coffee is a 2021 Indian Malayalam-language comedy-drama film directed by Baburaj and produced by Sajesh Manjeri. The film is a loose sequel to the 2011 movie Salt N' Pepper.

Synopsis
Following the events of Salt N' Pepper, cook Babu is staying with Kalidas and Maya. Due to some misunderstanding with Maya, Babu leaves their place and goes to Kochi. There, he meets a woman Ann Mary Cheriyan who asks him to buy a drink. She takes him to the flat where she stays with 3 other women Malu, Gayathri and Kshema and Babu stays with them as their cook. The women face some problems and Babu interferes in these problems and help them. The rest of the movie deals with the consequences and how it is handled by the others.

Cast
 Baburaj as Cook Babu
 Lal as Kalidasan
 Sunny Wayne as Davis
 Oviya as Marina Louis (Malu)
 Shwetha Menon as Maya
 Lena as Ann Mary Cheriyan
Rachana Narayanankutty as Gayathri
 Orma Bose as Kshema
 Shiyas Kareem as Roshan
 Sruthi Vipin as Manju
 Pradeep Kottayam
 Idavela Babu
 Subeesh Sudhi
 Sudheer Karamana as James
 Salu Kuttanadu as Flat Security
 Saju Kodiyan as Flat Caretaker
 Ambika Mohan
 Thesni Khan as Raasathi Tamannah
 Sunil Sainudeen as Abdul
 Urmila Unni as Susy
 Spadikam George
 Ponnamma Babu
 Molly Kannamaly
 Naseer Sankranthi
 Kelu Mooppan
 Ratheesh Nambiar as Food Delivery Boy

Reception
Times of India gave a rating of 3 out of 5 for Black Coffee.

References

2021 films
2021 comedy-drama films
Indian comedy-drama films
2020s Malayalam-language films